Luis Gonzalo Congo Minda (born 27 February 1989) is an Ecuadorian footballer who plays for Técnico Universitario as a forward.

Club career
Congo finished his formation at Imbabura, making his senior debuts in 2008 season. In 2010, he scored 17 goals, and achieved team promotion. In his first season in the first division, Congo scored 9 times, with his club being relegated again.

In December 2011, Congo signed with Deportivo Quito. He made his debut on 11 February 2012, against Manta.

References

External links
Ecuafutbol profile 

1989 births
Living people
People from Mira Canton
Ecuadorian footballers
Association football forwards
Ecuadorian Serie A players
Imbabura S.C. footballers
S.D. Quito footballers
L.D.U. Quito footballers
C.D. Cuenca footballers
C.D. Clan Juvenil footballers
Delfín S.C. footballers
C.D. El Nacional footballers
Footballers at the 2011 Pan American Games
Pan American Games competitors for Ecuador